The 1999 Open 13 was an ATP men's tennis tournament held in Marseille, France that was part of the World Series of the 1999 ATP Tour. It was the seventh edition of the tournament and was held from 1 February until 8 February 1999. Unseeded Fabrice Santoro won the singles title.

Finals

Singles

 Fabrice Santoro defeated  Arnaud Clément, 6–3, 4–6, 6–4
 It was Santoro's only singles title of the year and the 2nd of his career.

Doubles

 Max Mirnyi /  Andrei Olhovskiy defeated  David Adams /  Pavel Vízner, 7–5, 7–6(9–7)
 It was Mirnyi's 1st title of the year and the 2nd of his career. It was Olhovskiy's 1st title of the year and the 18th of his career.

References

External links
 Official website 
 ATP tournament profile
 ITF tournament edition details

 

Open 13
Open 13
Open 13